The South Eastern Reporter and South Eastern Reporter Second are United States regional case law reporters.  It is part of the National Reporter System created by John B. West for West Publishing Company, which is now part of Thomson West.

The South Eastern Reports contains published appellate court case decisions for:
 Georgia
 North Carolina
 South Carolina
 Virginia
 West Virginia

When cited, the South Eastern Reporter and South Eastern Reporter Second are abbreviated "S.E." and "S.E.2d", respectively.

References

National Reporter System